Notre Dame is a provincial electoral district (riding) in the Canadian province of Manitoba that was first contested in the 2019 Manitoba general election. Malaya Marcelino was elected the first member to the Legislative Assembly of Manitoba for the riding.

The riding was created by the 2018 provincial redistribution out of parts of Tyndall Park, Minto and Logan.

The riding contains the Winnipeg neighbourhoods of Brooklands, Weston, and parts of West Alexander, Logan-C.P.R., Centennial, Daniel McIntyre, and Sargeant Park.

The riding is named for Notre Dame Avenue, a local stretch of Winnipeg Route 57.

List of provincial representatives

Election results

References

Manitoba provincial electoral districts
Politics of Winnipeg
West End, Winnipeg